The Cabinet are individuals of Barbados which execute the duties of the Government of Barbados.
Under a Parliamentary republic , these powers are vested nominally by the President of Barbados, but are exercised in practice by a Cabinet of Ministers, presided over by the Prime Minister of Barbados. The Prime Minister is formally appointed by the President: the President must appoint, as Prime Minister, someone who can control a majority of votes in the House of Assembly. In practice, this is normally the leader of the largest political party or coalition in the house. When there is no clear majority, the president assumers the role of arbitrator and opens negotiations with the leaders of the various political parties, in the hope of finding someone whom a majority will accept as Prime Minister. In the event of that failing to take place, the President must dissolve the House of Assembly and call an early election.

History
The Cabinet system of government was implemented in the colony of Barbados on 1 February 1954 leading to attainment of full self-government. Prior to an official Cabinet, the role was fulfilled by the colonial era Executive Council on the island. Under the Constitution of Barbados, Cabinet is not prescribed a maximum number Cabinet of Ministers, however, it must have no fewer than five members.
The first Cabinet of Barbados was led by Premier Sir Grantley Herbert Adams. The four other Ministers were:
The Hon. Dr. H.G.H. Cummins (Member 1935–36; 1940–1961);
The Hon. Mencea Ethereal Cox (later Sir Mencea, member 1944–1961; senator 1976–1981;
The Hon. R. G. Mapp (later Sir Ronald, member 1946–1961; Senator 1976–1979);
The Hon. C. E. Talma (later Sir Edwy, member 1944–1948; 1951–1976)
Between 30 November 1966 and 30 November 2021, after Barbados was granted independence, under a Westminster system of governance, the ceremonial Head of State was Elizabeth II, Queen of Barbados (represented by the Governor-General) while the office of the Premier became the Prime minister as it is now presently known. After Barbados transitioned to a republic on 30 November, 2021, the Monarchy of Barbados was abolished along with the office of the Governor-General with the Governor-General's duties and powers transferring to the President of Barbados who became head of state.

Current 
The following represents to current composition of Ministers, following a Cabinet reshuffle on October 26, 2022.

List of Government Ministries, Ministers and Permanent Secretaries

Mia Mottley 2022 Cabinet

October 2022 Reshuffle 
On October 22, 2022, the Prime Minister announced the following changes to the Ministers with effect from October 26, 2022. Mr. Corey Lane is the only person to receive a promotion, moving from Parliamentary Secretary to Minister.

The Mia Mottley Cabinet 
The below table is the original list of Ministers with effect from January 24, 2022 to October 26, 2022.

Mia Mottley 2018 to 2022 Cabinet

The Mia Mottley Cabinet

Reassignments 
With effect from August 30, 2021, the Hon. Peter Phillips was reassigned from Minister in the Ministry of Agriculture and Food Security to Minister in the Ministry of Housing, Lands and Maintenance alongside the Minister of Housing, Lands and Maintenance, the Hon. William Duguid.

July 2020 Reshuffle 
On July 22, 2020 in a statement to the nation, the Prime Minister of Barbados, Mia Mottley, announced the following changes to take effect from July 23, 2020.

The Original Cabinet
The 26-member Cabinet announced by the Barbados Labour Party as of 26 May 2018:

Freundel Stuart 2015 Cabinet 
The 18-member Cabinet announced by the Democratic Labour Party as of 3 July 2015:

David Thompson 2008 Cabinet 
The full Cabinet of the previous Barbados Government administration as of February 2006:

In a reshuffle of his Cabinet late 2008, the following became the Cabinet until his passing.

Owen Arthur 2006 Cabinet 
The full Cabinet of the previous Barbados Government administration as of February 2006:

See also 
Table of precedence for Barbados
President of Barbados
Monarchy of Barbados
Governor-General of Barbados
Executive Council (Commonwealth countries)
Representatives to the United Nations

External links 
Cabinet Ministers of the Government of Barbados
Site of the Democratic Labour Party
Site of the Barbados Labour Party
Parliament of Barbados Official Site

References 

Government of Barbados
Politics of Barbados
Government ministries of Barbados